Marlston-cum-Lache is a former civil parish now in the parishes of Dodleston and Eaton and Eccleston, in Cheshire West and Chester, England. It contains two buildings that are recorded in the National Heritage List for England as listed buildings, both of which are at Grade II. This grade is the lowest of the three gradings given to listed buildings and is applied to "buildings of national importance and special interest". The parish is entirely rural, and both listed buildings are farmhouses.

See also
 Grade I listed buildings in Cheshire West and Chester
 Grade II* listed buildings in Cheshire West and Chester
 Grade II listed buildings in Chester (south) 
 Listed buildings in Dodleston
 Listed buildings in Eaton
 Listed buildings in Eccleston

References

Listed buildings in Cheshire West and Chester
Lists of listed buildings in Cheshire